Samuel T. "Saint" Saffold (born May 18, 1944)  is a former American football split end who played one season with the Cincinnati Bengals of the American Football League. He was drafted by the San Francisco 49ers in the fifteenth round of the 1966 NFL Draft. He was also drafted by the San Diego Chargers in the seventh round with the 62nd overall pick of the 1966 AFL redshirt draft. Saffold played college football at San Jose State University and attended Edison High School in Stockton, California.

References

External links
Just Sports Stats

Living people
1944 births
Players of American football from Mississippi
American football wide receivers
San Jose State Spartans football players
Cincinnati Bengals players
American Football League players